Ray Phillips is a former linebacker in the National Football League. Phillips was selected by the Cincinnati Bengals in the 1977 NFL draft. While a member of the Philadelphia Eagles, he participated in Super Bowl XV

References

People from Fordyce, Arkansas
Players of American football from Arkansas
Players of American football from Milwaukee
Cincinnati Bengals players
Philadelphia Eagles players
Nebraska Cornhuskers football players
American football linebackers
1954 births
Living people